Pie and mash is a traditional working-class food, originating in the Docks of London. It typically consists of a minced beef pie, mashed potato and a parsley sauce known as liquor. Pie, mash and eel shops have been in London since the 19th century, and are still common in East and South London, and in many parts of Kent and Essex. The shops may also serve stewed or jellied eels.

History
During the Victorian era, industrial air pollution tended to be worse in the east and southeast of London because of the prevailing westerly wind, with the result that the East End was settled more by the working classes, while the western part of the city was home to higher social classes.

The savoury pie had long been a traditional food, and its small handsized form also made it a transportable meal, protected from dirt by its cold pastry crust, and filled with cheap minced meat, usually mutton.

Jellied eels are often associated with pie and mash, as European eels cooked in gelatine also became a common worker's meal, since eels were one of the few forms of fish that could survive in the heavily polluted River Thames and London's other rivers at that time. Supply was plentiful through the late 19th century, particularly from the Dutch fishing boats landing catches at Billingsgate Fish Market.

Since 2010, as revealed in a joint study by the Zoological Society of London and the Environment Agency, the number of eels captured in research traps in the River Thames fell from 1,500 in 2005 to 50 in 2010, meaning most eels used in pie and mash shops are now from the Netherlands and Northern Ireland.

While eel consumption continues to go down in the 21st century (in 2000, there was only one stall selling live eels in Billingsgate Market), the number of eel and pie shops has not gone down very much: there were 87 eel and pie shops in Greater London in 1995, compared to around 110 at the end of 1800.

Composition
The main dish sold is pie and mash, a minced-beef and cold-water-pastry pie served with mashed potato. There should be two types of pastry used; the bottom or base should be suet pastry and the top can be rough puff or short. It is common for the mashed potato to be spread around one side of the plate and for a type of parsley sauce to be present. This is commonly called liquor sauce or simply liquor (liquor as in a liquid in which something has been steeped or cooked), traditionally made using the water kept from the preparation of the stewed eels. However, many shops no longer use stewed eel water in their parsley liquor. The sauce traditionally has a green colour, from the parsley.

Shops
Before shops became common, trading took place from braziers or carts. It was not until late Victorian times that shops began to appear. The first recorded shop was Henry Blanchard's at 101 Union Street in Southwark in 1844 which was described as an "Eel Pie House". The shops have become part of the local community and heritage of their area; for example, L. Manze in Walthamstow became Grade II listed by English Heritage in 2013 due to its architectural and cultural significance.

Traditionally, pie and mash shops have white tile walls with mirrors, and marble floors, tables and work tops, all of which are easy to clean. They give the shops, never called restaurants or café, a late Victorian or Art Deco appearance. 

Because of the large number of pleasure boat steamer companies offering Sunday trips on the River Thames, many Eastenders used them to explore the more gentrified west of London. The result was that many also wanted their traditional foods of ale and pie and mash, resulting in the renaming of both a hotel that they frequently visited and the island on which it sat in Twickenham to Eel Pie Island in the early 1900s.

References
Notes

Further reading
Clunn, Chris (1995) Eels, Pie and Mash: A Photographic Record of Pie 'n' Eel Shops. London: Museum of London. 
Pie 'n' Mash Club of Great Britain (1995) Pie 'n' Mash: A Guide to Londoners Traditional Eating Houses. J. Smith.

External links

2009 review of the best Pie & Mash shops by Time Out
2011 SpitalfieldsLife.com review of favourite Pie & Mash shops

English cuisine
Restaurants by type
Ground meat
Working-class culture in England